Albert I (8 April 1875 – 17 February 1934) was King of the Belgians from 23 December 1909 until his death in 1934.

Born in Brussels as the fifth child and second son of Prince Philippe, Count of Flanders, and Princess Marie of Hohenzollern-Sigmaringen, Albert succeeded his uncle, Leopold II, to the Belgian throne in 1909. He married Elisabeth of Bavaria, with whom he had three children. 

Albert ruled during an eventful period in the history of Belgium, which included the period of World War I (1914–1918), when most of Belgium was occupied by German forces. Other crucial events of his reign included the adoption of the Treaty of Versailles in June 1919, the ruling of the Belgian Congo as an overseas possession of Belgium along with the League of Nations mandate of Ruanda-Urundi, the reconstruction of Belgium following the war, and the first five years of the Great Depression (1929–1934).

Albert died in a mountaineering accident in eastern Belgium in 1934, at the age of 58, and he was succeeded by his son Leopold III. He is popularly referred to as the Knight King or Soldier King in Belgium in reference to his role during World War I.

Early life

Albert Léopold Clément Marie Meinrad was born 8 April 1875 in Brussels, the fifth child and second son of Prince Philippe, Count of Flanders, and his wife, Princess Marie of Hohenzollern-Sigmaringen. Prince Philippe was the third (second surviving) son of Leopold I, the first King of the Belgians, and his wife, Louise-Marie of France, and the younger brother of King Leopold II of Belgium. Princess Marie was a relative of Kaiser Wilhelm II of Germany, and a member of the non-reigning, Catholic branch of the Hohenzollern family. Albert grew up in the Palace of the Count of Flanders, initially as third in the line of succession to the Belgian throne as his reigning uncle Leopold II's son had already died. When, however, Albert's older brother, Prince Baudouin of Belgium, who had been subsequently prepared for the throne, also died young, Albert, at the age of 16, unexpectedly became second in line (after his father) to the Belgian Crown.

Retiring and studious, Albert prepared himself strenuously for the task of kingship. In his youth, Albert was seriously concerned with the situation of the working classes in Belgium, and personally travelled around working-class districts incognito, to observe the living conditions of the people. Shortly before his accession to the throne in 1909, Albert undertook an extensive tour of the Belgian Congo, which had been annexed by Belgium in 1908, finding the country in poor condition. Upon his return to Belgium, he recommended reforms to protect the native population and further technological progress in the colony.

Marriage
Albert was married in Munich on 2 October 1900 to Bavarian Duchess Elisabeth Gabrielle Valérie Marie, a Wittelsbach princess whom he had met at a family funeral. A daughter of Bavarian Duke Karl-Theodor, and his second wife, the Infanta Maria Josepha of Portugal, she was born at Possenhofen Castle, Bavaria, Germany, on 25 July 1876, and died on 23 November 1965.

The civil wedding was conducted by Friedrich Krafft Graf von Crailsheim in the Throne Hall, and the religious wedding was conducted by Cardinal von Stein, assisted by Jakob von Türk, Confessionar of the King of Bavaria.

Based on the letters written during their engagement and marriage (cited extensively in the memoirs of their daughter, Marie-José) the young couple appear to have been deeply in love. The letters express a deep mutual affection based on a rare affinity of spirit. They also make clear that Albert and Elisabeth continually supported and encouraged each other in their challenging roles as king and queen. The spouses shared an intense commitment to their country and family and a keen interest in human progress of all kinds. Together, they cultivated the friendship of prominent scientists, artists, mathematicians, musicians, and philosophers, turning their court at Laeken into a kind of cultural salon.

Children
Albert and Elisabeth had three children:
 Léopold Philippe Charles Albert Meinrad Hubert Marie Michel, Duke of Brabant, Prince of Belgium, who became later the fourth king of the Belgians as Leopold III (3 November 1901 – 25 September 1983, at Woluwe-Saint-Lambert).
 Charles Théodore Henri Antoine Meinrad, Count of Flanders, Prince of Belgium, Prince Regent of Belgium (10 October 1903, in Brussels – 1 June 1983, at Ostend).
 Marie-José Charlotte Sophie Amélie Henriette Gabrielle, last Queen of Italy (4 August 1906, in Ostend – 27 January 2001). She was married at Rome, Italy on 8 January 1930 to Prince Umberto Nicola Tommaso Giovanni Maria, Prince of Piemonte (born 15 September 1904 and died on 18 March 1983 at Geneva, Switzerland). He became King Umberto II (r. 1946) of Italy.

Accession

Following the death of his uncle, Leopold II, Albert succeeded to the Belgian throne in December 1909, since Albert's own father had died in 1905. Previous Belgian kings had taken the royal accession oath only in French; Albert innovated by taking it in Dutch as well. He and his wife, Queen Elisabeth, were popular in Belgium due to their simple, unassuming lifestyle and their harmonious family life, which stood in marked contrast to the aloof, autocratic manner and the irregular private life of Leopold II. An important aspect of the early years of Albert's reign was his institution of many reforms in the administration of the Belgian Congo, Belgium's only colonial possession.

Religion

King Albert was a devout Catholic. Many stories illustrate his deep and tender piety. For instance, when his former tutor General De Grunne, in his old age, entered the Benedictine monastery of Maredsous in Belgium, King Albert wrote a letter to him in which he spoke of the joy of giving oneself to God. He said: "May you spend many years at Maredsous in the supreme comfort of soul that is given to natures touched by grace, by faith in God's infinite power and confidence in His goodness." To another friend, Lou Tseng-Tsiang, a former prime minister of China who became a Catholic monk in Belgium, Albert wrote: "Consecrating oneself wholly to the service of Our Lord gives, to those touched by grace, the peace of soul which is the supreme happiness here below." Albert used to tell his children: "As you nourish your body, so you should nourish your soul." In an interesting meditation on what he viewed as the harm that would result if Christian ideals were abandoned in Belgium, he said: "Every time society has distanced itself from the Gospel, which preached humility, fraternity, and peace, the people have been unhappy, because the pagan civilisation of ancient Rome, which they wanted to replace it with, is based only on pride and the abuse of force" (Commemorative speech for the war dead of the Battle of the Yser, given by Dom Marie-Albert, Abbot of Orval Abbey, Belgium, in 1936).

World War I

At the start of World War I, Albert refused to comply with Germany's request for safe passage for its troops through Belgium in order to attack France, which the Germans alleged was about to advance into Belgium en route to attacking Germany in support of Russia. In fact, the French government had told its army commander not to go into Belgium before a German invasion. The German invasion brought Britain into the war as one of the guarantors of Belgian neutrality under the Treaty of 1839. King Albert, as prescribed by the Belgian constitution, took personal command of the Belgian Army, and held the Germans off long enough for Britain and France to prepare for the Battle of the Marne (6–9 September 1914). He led his army through the Siege of Antwerp (28 September – 10 October 1914) and the Battle of the Yser (16–31 October 1914), when the Belgian Army was driven back to a last, tiny strip of Belgian territory near the North Sea. Here the Belgians, in collaboration with the armies of the Triple Entente, took up a war of position, in the trenches behind the River Yser, remaining there for the next four years. During this period, King Albert fought alongside his troops and shared their dangers, while his wife, Queen Elisabeth, worked as a nurse at the front. During his time on the front, rumours spread on both sides of the lines that the German soldiers never fired upon him out of respect for him being the highest ranked commander in harm's way, while others feared risking punishment by the Kaiser himself, who was his cousin. The King also allowed his 12-year-old son, Prince Leopold, to enlist in the Belgian Army as a private and fight in the ranks.

The war inflicted great suffering on Belgium, which was subjected to a harsh German occupation. The King, fearing the destructive results of the war for Belgium and Europe and appalled by the huge casualty rates, worked through secret diplomatic channels for a negotiated peace between Germany and the Entente based on the "no victors, no vanquished" concept. He considered that such a resolution to the conflict would best protect the interests of Belgium and the future peace and stability of Europe. Neither Germany nor the Entente were favourable to the idea, tending instead to seek total victory, and Albert's attempts to further a negotiated peace were unsuccessful. At the end of the war, as commander of the Army Group Flanders, consisting of Belgian, British and French divisions, Albert led the final offensive of the war that liberated occupied Belgium. King Albert, Queen Elisabeth, and their children then reentered Brussels to a hero's welcome.

The King Albert I Memorial in Nieuwpoort is dedicated to king Albert and the Belgian troops during the Great War.

Post-war years

Upon his return to Brussels, King Albert made a speech in which he outlined the reforms he desired to see implemented in Belgium, including an improved military, universal suffrage and the establishment of a Flemish University in Ghent.

Trip to the United States

From 23 September through 13 November 1919, King Albert, Queen Elisabeth of Bavaria, and their son Prince Leopold made an official visit to the United States. King Albert and his party arrived in New York City on October 2. The party would then proceed to visit several sites in the Eastern United States including Boston and Niagara Falls, before heading to the Western United States. King Albert and his party arrived in California on October 10. Upon arrival in Sacramento, the King awarded the Order of Leopold II to the engineer who was onboard the King's special train. During his brief stay in Sacramento thousands came to see the Belgian royals, with mothers even holding out their babies for the King to kiss. During a visit of the historic Native American pueblo of Isleta Pueblo, New Mexico, King Albert decorated Father Anton Docher with Knight in the Order of Leopold II. Docher offered the King a turquoise cross mounted in silver made by the Tiwas Indians. Ten thousand people travelled to Isleta for this occasion. That same year he was elected an honorary member of the New York Society of the Cincinnati. 
In New York, the King received a ticker tape parade in his honor. The visit was considered a success by the Belgian authorities.

Introduction of universal male suffrage
Since the Belgian general strike of 1893, plural votes had been granted to individual men based on their wealth, education, and age, but after the Belgian general strike of 1913 the promise had been made to have constitutional reform for one man, one vote universal suffrage but the German invasion of Belgium in August 1914 and the subsequent occupation delayed the implementation of the commission's proposal.

In 1918, King Albert forged a post-war "Government of National Union" made up of members of the three main parties in Belgium, the Catholics, the Liberals, and the Socialists and attempted to mediate between the parties in order to bring about one man, one vote universal suffrage for men. He succeeded in doing so.

Paris Peace Conference

The Belgian Government sent the King to the Paris Peace Conference in April 1919, where he met with the leaders of France, Britain and the United States. He had four strategic goals:
 to restore and expand the Belgian economy using cash reparations from Germany;
 to assure Belgium's security by the creation of a new buffer state on the left bank of the Rhine;
 to revise the obsolete treaty of 1839;
 to promote a 'rapprochement' between Belgium and the Grand Duchy of Luxembourg.

He strongly advised against a harsh, restrictive treaty against Germany to prevent future German aggression. He also considered that the dethronement of the princes of Central Europe and, in particular, the dissolution of the Habsburg Empire would constitute a serious menace to peace and stability on the continent. The Allies considered Belgium to be the chief victim of the war, and it aroused enormous popular sympathy, but the King's advice played a small role in Paris.

Later years
Albert spent much of the remainder of his reign assisting in the postwar reconstruction of Belgium.

In 1920 Albert changed the family name from “Saxe-Coburg-Gotha” to “House of Belgium” (van België, in Dutch; de Belgique in French) as a result of strong anti-German sentiment. This mirrored the British royal family's name-change to House of Windsor in 1917.

Albert was a committed conservationist and in 1925, influenced by the ideas of Carl E. Akeley, he founded Africa's first national park, now known as Virunga National Park, in what is now Democratic Republic of Congo. During this period, he was also the first reigning European monarch to visit the United States.

Death
A passionate alpinist, King Albert I died in a mountaineering accident on 17 February 1934, while climbing alone on the Roche du Vieux Bon Dieu at Marche-les-Dames, in the Ardennes region of Belgium near Namur. His death shocked the world and he was deeply mourned, both in Belgium and abroad. Because King Albert was an expert climber, some questioned the official version of his death and suggested that the King was murdered (or even committed suicide) somewhere else and that his body had never been at Marche-les-Dames, or that it was deposited there. Several of those hypotheses with criminal motives were investigated by authorities, but doubts have remained ever since, being the subject of popular novels, books, and documentaries. Rumors of murder have been dismissed by most historians. In 2016, DNA testing by geneticist Dr. Maarten Larmuseau and colleagues from the Katholieke Universiteit Leuven on bloodstained leaves that were collected from Marche-les-Dames concluded that King Albert had died at that location.

Like his predecessors Leopold I and Leopold II, King Albert is interred in the Royal Crypt at the Church of Our Lady of Laeken in Brussels.

In 1935, prominent Belgian author Emile Cammaerts published a widely acclaimed biography of King Albert I, titled Albert of Belgium: Defender of Right. In 1993, a close climbing companion of the King, Walter Amstutz, founded the King Albert I Memorial Foundation, an association based in Switzerland and dedicated to honouring distinguished individuals in the mountaineering world.

To celebrate 175 years of Belgian Dynasty and the 100th anniversary of his accession, Albert I was selected as the main motif of a high-value collectors' coin: the Belgian 12.5 euro Albert I commemorative coin, minted in 2008. The obverse shows a portrait of the King.

Ancestry

See also
 Kings of Belgium family tree
 Crown Council of Belgium
 Royal Trust

References

Further reading

 Galet, Emile Joseph. Albert King of the Belgians in the Great War (1931), detailed memoir by the military advisor to the King; covers 1912 to the end of October 1914
 Woodward, David. "King Albert in World War I" History Today (1975) 25#9 pp. 638–43
 D'Ydewalle, Charles. "Albert King of the Belgians"(1935) Translated by Phyllis Megroz D'Ydewalle a journalist describes his book in the foreword.."This book is not a history, it is a sheaf of memories" The final chapter contains interviews with the people who discovered the king's body after his climbing accident
 Catherine Barjansky. Portraits with Backgrounds.
 Mary Elizabeth Thomas, "Anglo-Belgian Military Relations and the Congo Question, 1911–1913", Journal of Modern History, Vol. 25, No. 2 (June 1953), pp. 157–165.

External links

 Official biography from the Belgian Royal Family website
 Funeral of King Albert of The Belgians, newsreel on the British Movietone YouTube Channel
 Information about King Albert's mountaineering feats
 Belgium in the First World War, including stories of the royal couple, in French
 Archive Albert I of Belgium, Royal museum of central Africa
 
 

1875 births
1934 deaths
19th-century Belgian people
20th-century Belgian monarchs
Burials at the Church of Our Lady of Laeken
Nobility from Brussels
Belgian monarchs
Princes of Saxe-Coburg and Gotha
House of Saxe-Coburg and Gotha (Belgium)
House of Belgium
British field marshals
Belgian Roman Catholics
Sport deaths in Belgium
Mountaineering deaths

Grand Crosses of the Royal Order of the Lion
Grand Crosses of the Order of the Crown (Belgium)
Recipients of the Grand Cross of the Order of Leopold II
Recipients of the Croix de guerre (Belgium)

Knights of the Golden Fleece of Austria
Grand Crosses of the Order of Saint Stephen of Hungary
Collars of the Order of the White Lion
Bailiffs Grand Cross of the Order of St John
Extra Knights Companion of the Garter
Honorary Knights Grand Cross of the Order of the Bath
Grand Crosses of the Order of the Cross of Vytis
Recipients of the Order of Lāčplēsis, 1st class
Knights Grand Cross of the Military Order of Savoy
3
3
3
Recipients of the Order of the White Eagle (Russia)
Recipients of the Order of St. Anna, 1st class
Grand Crosses of the Virtuti Militari
Grand Crosses of the Order of the Star of Romania
Grand Crosses of the Order of Saint-Charles
Recipients of the Distinguished Flying Cross (United Kingdom)
Recipients of the Order of the Cross of Takovo
Knights of Malta
Knights of the Holy Sepulchre
Recipients of the Order of the Netherlands Lion
Grand Crosses with Diamonds of the Order of the Sun of Peru
Recipients of the Order of the White Eagle (Poland)
Accidental deaths in Belgium